Tmesisternus conicicollis is a species of beetle in the family Cerambycidae. It was described by James Thomson in 1864.

It is 10 mm long and 3⅔ mm wide. Its junior synonym, T. strandi  was named in honor of Embrik Strand, in whose Festschrift the species description was written.

References

conicicollis